Brandy Colbert is an American author of young adult fiction and non-fiction, best known for her Stonewall Children's Award-winning novel Little & Lion.

Personal life 
Colbert was born and raised in the Ozarks, in Springfield, Missouri, where she attended Glendale High School. The works of Dorothy West, Barthe DeClements, Jesmyn Ward, Colson Whitehead, and Zadie Smith were impactful to her writing career. She began working on what would be her debut novel, Pointe, in 2009, inspired by reports of long-term kidnapping cases. Colbert also teaches at the Hamline University’s MFA Program in Writing for Children.

Works 
Her debut young adult Pointe, following a teen dancer in suburban Chicago who has to come to terms with her dark past, was published in 2014 by Putnam. A Chicago Tribune reviewer described the novel as "searing", and considered the main character "achingly believable", writing that she "inspires that level of connection" where "you long to reach into the pages ... and tell her, "No, you've got it all wrong". The book received a starred review from Publishers Weekly.

Her next young adult novel, Little & Lion, about a sixteen-year-old bisexual teen dealing with her brother's recent bipolar disorder diagnosis and her own sexuality, was published by Little, Brown in 2017. It received a starred review from Booklist, and School Library Journal. It was named a Best Teen Romance of 2017 by Kirkus Reviews. Little & Lion also won the 2018 Stonewall Children’s and Young Adult Literature Award.

Her third novel, Finding Yvonne, about a privileged teenager deciding what to do with her future when she inexpectedly becomes pregnant, was published by Little, Brown in 2018.

In 2019, her fourth novel, The Revolution of Birdie Randolph, a coming-of-age story about a 16-year-old girl, was published by Little, Brown.

Colbert's first middle grade novel, The Only Black Girls in Town, about two black girls who find a mysterious journal in their attic, was published by Little, Brown in March 2020. Colbert says she found writing Middle Grade books intimidating, because she perceived writing for a younger audience as harder, and says that she wanted to write something that would've spoken to her as a kid. The initial idea for the novel came to her as she thought about what would happen if a character thought they were the only Black girl in town, but then another one moved in across the street. She cites Judy Blume and Beverly Clearly's books as influences for the novel.

The Only Black Girls in Town received a starred review from Kirkus Reviews and Publishers Weekly.

This was followed in 2020 by The Voting Booth, about two 18-year-olds on their first election day as registered voters, published by Disney Hyperion in 2020.

Colbert also contributed short stories to anthologies published by St. Martin's Griffin in 2016, Algonquin Books in 2017, Simon Pulse in 2017 and 2018, HarperCollins in 2017, Harlequin Teen in 2018, and Balzer + Bray in 2019.

Awards 
 Stonewall Children’s and Young Adult Literature Award for Little & Lion (Little, Brown, 2017)

References 

Living people
Women writers of young adult literature
21st-century American women writers
21st-century American novelists
American women novelists
African-American novelists
Year of birth missing (living people)
Hamline University faculty
Stonewall Book Award winners
American women academics
21st-century African-American women writers
21st-century African-American writers